Babette is a 1917 American silent drama film directed by Charles Brabin and starring Marc McDermott, Peggy Hyland and Templar Saxe.

Cast
 Marc McDermott as Raveau
 Peggy Hyland as Babette
 Templar Saxe as Pivot
 William R. Dunn as Guinard

References

Bibliography
Parish, James Robert & Pitts, Michael R. . Film Directors: A Guide to their American Films. Scarecrow Press, 1974.

External links
 

1917 films
1917 drama films
1910s English-language films
American silent feature films
Silent American drama films
American black-and-white films
Films directed by Charles Brabin
Vitagraph Studios films
1910s American films